Pogonissonkaha (often shortened to Pogo) is a village in the far north of Ivory Coast. It is in the sub-prefecture of Ferkessédougou, Ferkessédougou Department, Tchologo, Savanes District.

Pogonissonkaha was a commune until March 2012, when it became one of 1126 communes nationwide that were abolished.

Notes

Former communes of Ivory Coast
Populated places in Savanes District
Populated places in Tchologo